François Perrodo (born 14 February 1977) is a French billionaire businessman, racing driver, and car collector. He is the chairman of Perenco, an oil and gas company with operations in 16 countries, which was founded by his father. In December 2022, Forbes estimated his family to be worth US$7.4 billion.

Biography

Origin
François Perrodo was born on 14 February 1977 in Singapore. He is the son of Carrie and Hubert Perrodo, French businessman and founder of the oil group Perenco.

Education

François Perrodo has a degree in physics from St Peter's College, Oxford, where he captained the University polo team in 1999. He is now a member of Guards Polo Club.

After an engineering degree in 2002 from the École Nationale Supérieure du Pétrole et des Moteurs (ENSPM) now called IFP School (French Institute of Petroleum), he received an MBA from INSEAD in Singapore.

Business
He is the president of the independent Franco-British oil company Perenco, after his father died in 2006 in a hiking accident near Courchevel, and has run the family business since 2007.

Car Collection 
Perrodo maintains a large collection of historically significant automobiles and is one of the most prolific French car collectors. He keeps cars in both France and the United Kingdom. Perrodo shares photos and stories of his cars and his racing career on his Instagram account.

The collection includes:

 McLaren F1 #069
 McLaren F1 #045
 McLaren F1 GTR 4R
 McLaren F1 GTR 5R
 Ferrari 250 GT/L Berlinetta
 Ferrari 250 GTO s/n 3387 (purchased in 2016 for $56.4 million)
 Ferrari 250 SWB Competizione
 Ferrari 250 SWB Berlinetta
 Ferrari 250 GT SWB California Spyder (Grey)
 Ferrari 250 GT SWB California Spyder (Black)
 Ferrari 275 GTB/2
 Ferrari 275 GTB/C
 Ferrari 333 SP
 Ferrari 288 GTO
 Ferrari F40
 Ferrari F40
 Ferrari F50
 Ferrari SA Aperta
 Ferrari 550 Barchetta Pininfarina
 Ferrari LaFerrari
 Ferrari Monza SP2
 Ferrari 550 Maranello GTS
 Ferrari 365 GTS/4
 Bugatti EB110 Super Sport
 Bugatti Veyron 16.4 Grand Sport Vitesse
 Bugatti Chiron Pur Sport
 Bugatti Centodieci
 Porsche 910
 Porsche 917K
 Porsche 911 GT1 Evo
 Porsche 911 GT2 993 (Red)
 Porsche 911 GT2 993 (Yellow)
 Porsche 911 GT2 993 (Blue)
 Porsche 911 GT3 RS 4.0 997 (White)
 Porsche 911 GT3 RS 4.0 997 (Black)
 Porsche Carrera GT
 Porsche RS Spyder Evo
 Porsche RS Spyder Evo
 Maserati MC12
 Maserati MC12 (Blue Carbon Fibre)
 Maserati MC12 GT1
 Aston Martin DBR9
 Alpine A110 (2017)
 Lancia Delta Integrale
 2008 McLaren MP4-23A Formula 1 car driven by Lewis Hamilton, winning Australian and Monaco GP.
 Lamborghini Diablo SE

The collection used to include the following, which have since been sold:

 McLaren P1
 McLaren Senna
 McLaren 675LT
 Porsche 918 Spyder
 Lamborghini Huracán Performante
 Mercedes-Benz AMG SLS Black Series
 Lexus LFA
 Ford GT (2017)

Racing driver

Perrodo is a motorsport enthusiast, he started with classic car racing in 2010.

He competes in endurance racing in the FIA World Endurance Championship, currently having leveraged his fortune into a ride with AF Corse in the LMP2 class, having initially competed in the GTE Am class from 2013 until 2016. 
He has taken part in the 24 Hours of Le Mans, V de V Series, Blancpain GT Series Endurance Cup, European Le Mans Series (ELMS), United SportsCar Championship and the 24 Hours Series.

Perrodo again competed for AF Corse in the 2022 24 Hours of Le Mans, driving the team's No. 83 LMP2 entry. While running side-by-side with the GTE-Pro class leading No. 64 Corvette of Alexander Sims in the final hours of the race, Perrodo swerved sharply left and sent the Corvette crashing into the barriers in the middle of the Mulsanne Straight. AF Corse's No. 51 GTE-Pro entry was running second in class at the time and went on to inherit the class lead from the Corvette.

Complete European Le Mans Series results
(key) (Races in bold indicate pole position; races in italics indicate fastest lap)

Complete FIA World Endurance Championship results

Complete 24 Hours of Le Mans results

Complete IMSA SportsCar Championship results
(key) (Races in bold indicate pole position) (Races in italics indicate fastest lap)

References

External links
 Official Company website
 

1977 births
Living people
Alumni of St Peter's College, Oxford
Businesspeople in the oil industry
French chief executives
French racing drivers
European Le Mans Series drivers
24 Hours of Le Mans drivers
FIA World Endurance Championship drivers
Blancpain Endurance Series drivers
24 Hours of Spa drivers
24 Hours of Daytona drivers
WeatherTech SportsCar Championship drivers
French people of Hong Kong descent
People from Singapore
R-ace GP drivers
AF Corse drivers
TDS Racing drivers
FIA Motorsport Games drivers
Nürburgring 24 Hours drivers
24H Series drivers